Dr. Marco Guglielmi (born December 17, 1954) is an Italian electrical engineer and physicist, formerly part of the European Space Agency and ESTEC. He was named Fellow of the Institute of Electrical and Electronics Engineers (IEEE) in 2013.

Early life and education 
Guglielmi was born on December 17, 1954 in Rome, Italy. He was educated at the Sapienza University of Rome, getting his degree in electronic engineering in 1979. In 1980, he attended the Sapienza University's School of Specialization in Applied Electromagnetism. In 1982, Guglielmi received a master's degree in electrical engineering from the University of Bridgeport. From 1982 he took a PhD course in Electrophysics at the Polytechnic University, Brooklyn, receiving his doctorate in 1986.

Career 
In 2013, Guglielmi was named Fellow of the Institute of Electrical and Electronics Engineers (IEEE) "for contributions to multimode equivalent network representations and microwave filter design". He was made a Life Fellow in 2020. Guglielmi is a member of the IEEE's Microwave Theory and Technology society, being a part of their TC-5 Filters Committee.

References 

Fellow Members of the IEEE
Living people
1954 births